Aimee Schmidt (born 16 April 1993) is an Australian rules footballer playing for West Coast in the AFL Women's (AFLW) competition. She previously played for Greater Western Sydney.

AFLW career
Schmidt was drafted by Greater Western Sydney with their third selection and seventeenth overall in the 2016 AFL Women's draft. She played every match in her debut season to finish with seven games.

Schmidt left Greater Western Sydney in June 2021 and joined West Coast as a free agent. She made her debut for West Coast in round 1 of the 2022 season, against Fremantle.

References

External links 

1993 births
Living people
Greater Western Sydney Giants (AFLW) players
Australian rules footballers from Western Australia
West Coast Eagles (AFLW) players